Jean Bocahut (20 September 1919 – 19 August 1995) was a French rower. He competed in the men's eight event at the 1948 Summer Olympics.

References

1919 births
1995 deaths
French male rowers
Olympic rowers of France
Rowers at the 1948 Summer Olympics
Rowers from Paris